The Best of Renee Geyer 1973-1998 is the third greatest hits album by Australian musician Renée Geyer. It was released in May 1998 by Mushroom Records. 
The album was re-released in August 2004 under the title The Definitive Collection 1973-1998.

Track listing

Charts

Release history

References

1998 greatest hits albums
Renée Geyer albums
Mushroom Records compilation albums
Compilation albums by Australian artists
Albums produced by Joe Camilleri